The 2009–10 football season was Bristol City's 112th season as a professional football club and third consecutive season in the second division. They competed in the Football League Championship having finished in tenth position the previous season. Bristol City were knocked out in the second round of the Football League Cup against Carlisle United. They also entered the FA Cup in January 2010 at the third round stage, losing to Cardiff City after a replay.

Competitions

League One

League table

Results

FA Cup

Football League Cup

References

Bristol City
Bristol City F.C. seasons